Sir Ronald Charles Lindsay  (3 May 1877 – 21 August 1945) was a British civil servant and diplomat. He was Ambassador to Turkey from 1925 to 1926 and to Germany from 1926 to 1928, Permanent Under-Secretary for Foreign Affairs from 1928 to 1930 and Ambassador to the United States from 1930 to 1939.

Background and education
Lindsay was the fifth son of James Lindsay, 26th Earl of Crawford, by Emily Florence Bootle-Wilbraham. David Lindsay, 27th Earl of Crawford, was his elder brother and his maternal grandfather was Colonel the Honourable Edward Bootle-Wilbraham (second son of Edward Bootle-Wilbraham, 1st Baron Skelmersdale).

He was educated at the Winchester School in Winchester, Hampshire.

Career
Lindsay was appointed Third Secretary in the Diplomatic Service in January 1901, and advanced to First Secretary in 1911. From 1913 to 1919 he was Under-Secretary of Finance for Egypt, and was made a Grand Officer of the Order of the Nile by the Sultan of Egypt in 1915. From 1919 to 1920 he was Counsellor of the Embassy in Washington D.C., before being posted as Minister Plenipotentiary to France in September 1920. Following this, in 1921, he was appointed the Assistant Under-Secretary of State for the Foreign Office, a post he held until 1924. In 1925, he was appointed the Ambassador to Turkey and was sworn of the Privy Council later that year. In 1926, he moved to become Ambassador to Germany. He returned to London in 1928 to become the Permanent Under-Secretary of State for Foreign Affairs, the civil service head of the Foreign Office.

British Ambassador to the United States
After two years as Permanent Secretary, Lindsay was named as the Ambassador to the United States in November 1929, and took up the position early the next year. He was the first ambassador to move into the brand-new British embassy in 1930, and remained in Washington for almost a decade, retiring in June 1939 to be replaced by Lord Lothian.

Lindsay served an extraordinarily long term of nine years as U.S. ambassador, also as the Dean of the Diplomatic Corps from July 1934 to August 1939, his tenure being extended because of his effectiveness as a diplomat and the growing importance of American assistance during the years leading up to World War II.

His last major official act as ambassador was to host the 1939 Royal Garden Party for King George VI and Queen Elizabeth during the first-ever visit to the United States by a reigning British monarch. The Royal Garden Party at the British embassy was considered the social event of the year in Washington.

Honours
Lindsay was appointed a Member of the Royal Victorian Order (MVO) in 1908, a Companion of the Order of the Bath in 1922, a Knight Commander of the Order of St Michael and St George in 1924, and a Knight Grand Cross of the Order of St Michael and St George in 1926.

Personal life
Lindsay was married twice, both times to Americans; in 1909 to Martha Cameron, daughter of J. Donald Cameron (a U.S. Senator from Pennsylvania and the 32nd Secretary of War)  and his wife Elizabeth Sherman Cameron; and after his first wife's death in April 1918, he married prominent landscape gardener Elizabeth Sherman Hoyt, daughter of Colgate Hoyt, in 1924. Both wives were grandnieces of William Tecumseh Sherman. There were no children from either marriage.

Lindsay died in Bournemouth in August 1945, aged 68. Lady Lindsay died in September 1954, aged 68.

References

Sources
Spinzia, Raymond E. and Judith A. Long Island's Prominent North Shore Families: Their Estates and Their Country Homes. vol. I. College Station, TX, 2006

1877 births
1945 deaths
People educated at Winchester College
Ambassadors of the United Kingdom to the United States
Deans of the Diplomatic Corps to the United States
Members of HM Diplomatic Service
Ambassadors of the United Kingdom to Turkey
Younger sons of earls
Permanent Under-Secretaries of State for Foreign Affairs
Ambassadors of the United Kingdom to Germany
Ronald
Knights Grand Cross of the Order of the Bath
Knights Grand Cross of the Order of St Michael and St George
Commanders of the Royal Victorian Order
Members of the Privy Council of the United Kingdom
20th-century British diplomats